Joshua Lemay (born May 29, 1987) is a Canadian professional wrestler better known by the ring name Josh Alexander. He is currently signed to Impact Wrestling, where he is the current and longest reigning Impact World Champion in his second reign. He is also a former Impact X Division Champion.

He is a two-time Impact World Tag Team Champion with Ethan Page as The North, as well as a one-time PWG World Tag Team Champion with Ethan Page as Monster Mafia, and a one-time AAW Heavyweight Champion.

Professional wrestling career

Independent circuit (2005–present) 
Josh Alexander was trained to wrestle by Johnny Devine. He debuted in 2005. He then started his career on the regional Canadian independent circuit. He met fellow wrestler Ethan Page in the Alpha-1 promotion in Ontario in 2010, where the two became close friends. A year later, they formed the tag team Monster Mafia where they wrestled for various promotions including Ring of Honor (ROH) and AAW Wrestling. In 2013 he suffered a neck injury during a AAW match. After taking time off to heal, he returned to action. A few months after, he reinjured his neck during a ROH tryout match with ReDRagon. He had herniated a disk so he would have his C5-C6 vertebrae fused to fix the injury.

However, he did not take time off during this time and kept the injury a secret, not wanting to squander the opportunity to work with ROH. In February 2015, Monster Mafia debuted for Pro Wrestling Guerilla (PWG), facing The Young Bucks in their first match. He would shortly after again injure his neck in a match with Matt Sydal and Chris Sabin. Alexander would again work through it, with Page and him participating in the annual Dynamite Duumvirate Tag Team Title Tournament in May. They would win the PWG World Tag Team Championship in the first round match with Joey Ryan and Candice LeRae. The reign would be short-lived, losing it later that night. Alexander would again have neck surgery in July 2015, retiring from wrestling.

After him and Page momentary went their separate ways, he wrestled for Absolute Intense Wrestling (AIW), Progress Wrestling, and Beyond Wrestling, among other promotions.

Impact Wrestling

The North (2019–2021) 

Alexander began appearing in Impact Wrestling in 2018 by making appearances on Xplosion as an enhancement talent against the likes of Killer Kross and Matt Sydal. In February 2019, Alexander signed a three-year contract with the promotion. Impact Wrestling subsequently hyped Alexander's debut with an online documentary made by Toronto-based filmmaker Glen Matthews. Alexander reformed with Ethan Page under the name The North, as they defeated El Reverso and Sheldon Jean on the April 12 episode of Impact! while subsequently establishing himself as a heel. North would team up with Moose to defeat The Rascalz in a six-man tag team match at Rebellion, marking Alexander's pay-per-view debut in Impact.

On the June 14 episode of Impact!, North defeated Rob Van Dam and Sabu to earn a title shot against The Latin American Xchange (Santana and Ortiz) for the World Tag Team Championship at the Bash at the Brewery event on July 5. North defeated LAX at the event to win the titles for the first time. North retained the titles against LAX and The Rascalz in a three-way match at Slammiversary in their first title defense. North would go on to retain the titles throughout the rest of the year against Reno Scum and the team of Rich Swann and Willie Mack at Unbreakable, the team of Swann and Mack and the team of Rob Van Dam and Rhino at Bound for Glory and Swann and Mack at Turning Point. They would go on to become the longest-reigning World Tag Team Champions as they retained the titles in 2020 against Willie Mack in a handicap match at Hard To Kill, The Rascalz at Sacrifice and the team of Ken Shamrock and Sami Callihan at Slammiversary until they lost it against The Motor City Machine Guns on the July 21 episode of Impact!. 

The North unsuccessfully challenged Motor City Machine Guns in a rematch for the World Tag Team Championship at Emergence but regained the titles at Bound for Glory, before lost it a few weeks later to The Good Brothers at Turning Point. Then, Alexander and Page started a storyline where they did not work well together, leading to Page's departure from Impact.

X Division Champion (2021–2022) 
Following the departure of Ethan Page, Alexander returned to singles competition. He faced Brian Myers at the Hard To Kill pre-show in a losing effort. On the January 19 episode of Impact!, Alexander turned face when he confronted Ace Austin backstage. He was subsequently assaulted by Austin and Madman Fulton until new signee Matt Cardona came to even the odds. This would culminate into a tag team match the following week, where Alexander and Cardona emerged victorious.

At No Surrender, Alexander won a Triple Threat Revolver match to be the number one contender to the Impact X Division Championship, where he lost against TJP on the February 16 episode of Impact!. At Rebellion, he defeated Ace Austin and TJP to win the X Division Championship for the first time. On the April 29 episode of Impact!, Alexander made his first successful title defense against Austin. At Under Siege on May 15, he had another successful title defense against New Japan Pro-Wrestling (NJPW) talent El Phantasmo. On June 3, Alexander defended the title against TJP in Impact's first-ever 60-minute Iron man match, winning 2–1 in sudden death overtime. At Slammiversary on July 17, Alexander successfully retained his X Division Championship in an Ultimate X match against Austin, Chris Bey, Petey Williams, Rohit Raju, and Trey Miguel. Alexander then retained his title against Black Taurus at Homecoming, against Jake Something at Emergence, and against Chris Sabin at Victory Road.

Later that night at Victory Road, Alexander confronted Impact World Champion Christian Cage (who had retained his title moments before against Ace Austin), invoking Option C to relinquish his X Division Championship for a World Championship match in the main event of Bound for Glory. At Bound for Glory on October 23, Alexander defeated Cage to win the Impact World Championship. However, while celebrating with his family, he lost the title to Moose, who cashed in his Call Your Shot Gauntlet trophy. At Turning Point, Alexander called out Moose but was instead attacked by the debuting Jonah. At Hard To Kill, Alexander defeated Jonah. On February 14, 2022, Alexander announced that his contract with Impact Wrestling had expired.

Longest-reigning Impact World Champion (2022–present) 
At Sacrifice on March 5, Alexander made his return, attacking Impact World Champion Moose after his match against Heath. Alexander revealed that he signed a new multi-year contract with Impact Wrestling, while also challenging Moose for the Impact World Championship in the main event of Rebellion. At Rebellion, Alexander defeated Moose in the main event to capture the Impact World Championship for a second time. At Under Siege on May 7, Alexander made his first successful title defense against NJPW talent Tomohiro Ishii. At Slammiversary on June 19, he had another successful title defense against Eric Young. He would successfully defend his world title against Joe Doering at Against All Odds, ending Doering's undefeated streak in Impact Wrestling.

On July 31, at Ric Flair's Last Match event, Alexander defended the title against Major League Wrestling (MLW) talent Jacob Fatu, but it ended in a no contest due to interference from Brian Myers, Matt Cardona and Mark Sterling. On August 12, at Emergence, Alexander successfully defended the world title against Alex Shelley. On September 23, at Victory Road, he teamed with Heath and Rich Swann to face Honor No More (Eddie Edwards, Matt Taven, and Mike Bennett) in a six-man tag team match, suffering his first pinfall loss in nearly a year. At Bound for Glory, Alexander made another successful title defense against Edwards, before being confronted by Call Your Shot Gauntlet winner Bully Ray. On November 18, at Over Drive, Alexander retained his title against Frankie Kazarian. On the December 8 episode of Impact!, Alexander fought Mike Bailey for nearly an hour to successfully defend his title, garnering positive reviews from critics.

On January 4, 2023, Alexander surpassed Bobby Roode's reign of 256 days, thus becoming the longest-reigning Impact World Champion. Nine days later, at Hard To Kill, Alexander defeated Call Your Shot Gauntlet winner Bully Ray in a Full Metal Mayhem match to retain the title. On February 24, at No Surrender, Alexander defeated Rich Swann to retain the title.

New Japan Pro-Wrestling (2021–present) 
Alexander made his debut for New Japan Pro-Wrestling on the June 18, 2021 episode of NJPW Strong and defeated Alex Coughlin. On February 18, 2023, at Battle in the Valley, Alexander teamed with Máscara Dorada, Adrian Quest and Rocky Romero for an eight-man tag team match against Kushida, Volador Jr., Kevin Knight and The DKC in a losing effort.

Personal life 
Lemay has been married to fellow professional wrestler Jade Chung since 2016. Together they have two children. In addition to his wrestling career, Lemay worked as a construction insulator until September 1, 2021.

Lemay revealed on Twitter in May 2021 that he wears amateur wrestling-styled headgear after developing a serious case of cauliflower ear in 2013 that resulted in the temporary amputation of his left ear to remove scar tissue; he wore the headgear to protect the ear after it was reattached. Although Lemay doesn't need the headgear now, he has continued to wear the headgear as it fits with his shoot-style gimmick, making him and Rick Steiner among the few professional wrestlers with amateur backgrounds to wear the amateur-style headgear on a regular basis.

Championships and accomplishments 

 AAW Wrestling
 AAW Heavyweight Championship (2 times) 
 Jim Lynam Memorial Tournament (2019)
 Absolute Intense Wrestling
 AIW Absolute Championship (1 time)
 JT Lightning Invitational Tournament (2016)
 Alpha-1 Wrestling
 A1 Alpha Male Championship (4 times)
 A1 Zero Gravity Championship (1 time)
 A1 Tag Team Championship (2 times) – with Tyson Dux and Gavin Quinn (1) and Ethan Page (1)
 King Of Hearts (2018)
 Capital City Championship Combat
 C4 Championship (1 time) 
 C4 Tag Team Championship (1 time) – with Rahim Ali
Collective League Of Adrenaline Strength And Honor
 CLASH Championship (1 time)
 Cross Body Pro Wrestling Academy
 CBPW Championship (2 times)
 Deathproof Fight Club
 DFC Championship (1 time)
 Destiny World Wrestling
 DWW Championship (1 time, current)
 DWW Interim Championship (1 time)
 Fringe Pro Wrestling
 FPW Tag Team Championship (1 time) – with Ethan Page
 Great Canadian Wrestling
 GCW Tag Team Championship (1 time) – with Tyler Tirva
 Impact Wrestling
 Impact World Championship (2 times, current)
 Impact X Division Championship (1 time)
 Impact World Tag Team Championship (2 times) – with Ethan Page
Ninth Triple Crown Champion
 Impact Year End Awards (7 times)
 Tag Team of the Year (2019, 2020) – with Ethan Page
 Male Wrestler of the Year (2021, 2022)
 Men's Match of the Year (2021) 
 Match of the Year (2022) 
 Moment of the Year (2022) 
 Insane Wrestling League
 IWL Tag Team Championship (1 time) – with Ethan Page
 International Wrestling Cartel
 IWC Super Indy Championship (2 times)
 IWC Tag Team Championship (1 time) – with Ethan Page
 Super Indy 15
 New School Wrestling
 NSW Heavyweight Championship (2 time)
 NSW Cruiserweight Championship (1 time)
 NSW Tag Team Championship (1 time) – with Steve Brown
 No Limits Wrestling
 NLW Strong Style Championship (1 time)
 Steel City Strong Style Tournament (2018)
 Pro Wrestling Guerrilla
 PWG World Tag Team Championship (1 time) – with Ethan Page 
 Pro Wrestling Illustrated
 Ranked No. 14 of the top 500 singles wrestlers in the PWI 500 in 2022
 Ranked No. 4 of the top 50 tag teams in the PWI Tag Team 50 in 2020 
Pro Wrestling Ontario
 PWO Trios Championship (1 time) – with Scotty O'Shea and Steve Brown
 Pure Wrestling Association
 PWA Elite Championship (1 time)
 PWA Pure Violence Championship (1 time)
 PWA Niagara Tag Team Championship (1 time) – with Reese Runnels
 Sports Illustrated
 Ranked No. 9 of the top 10 wrestlers in 2021
 Squared Circle Wrestling
 SCW Premier Championship (2 times)
 Steel City Pro Wrestling
 SCPW Tag Team Championship (1 time) – with Ethan Page
 The Wrestling Revolver 
 PWR Tag Team Championship (1 time) – with Ethan Page
 Union Of Independent Professional Wrestlers
 UNION Heavyweight Championship (1 time)

References

External links 

Josh Alexander profile at Impact Wrestling
 
 
 

1987 births
21st-century professional wrestlers
Canadian expatriate professional wrestlers in the United States
Canadian male professional wrestlers
Living people
Professional wrestlers from Ontario
Sportspeople from Ontario
TNA World Heavyweight/Impact World Champions
TNA/Impact World Tag Team Champions
TNA/Impact X Division Champions
PWG World Tag Team Champions
AAW Heavyweight Champions